The 1999–2000 season was the 102nd season of competitive football played by Arsenal. The club ended the campaign second in the league, 18 points behind Manchester United. Arsenal exited both domestic cup competitions on penalties, being eliminated by Leicester City in a FA Cup fourth round replay and by Middlesbrough at the same stage of the Football League Cup. For the second consecutive season Arsenal failed to progress past the group stage of the UEFA Champions League; a third-place finish, however, earned them a consolation place in the UEFA Cup. Arsenal eventually reached the final to play Galatasaray in Copenhagen – the match was overshadowed by altercations between both sets of supporters. Arsenal lost 4–1 on penalties after a goalless draw.

A number of signings were made by Arsenal in the summer transfer window, namely defenders Sylvinho and Oleh Luzhnyi, and striker Thierry Henry, who joined from Juventus on a club record fee. Davor Šuker departed Real Madrid to sign for Arsenal, following Nicolas Anelka's move in the opposite direction. Steve Bould left Arsenal to play for Sunderland, while Stephen Hughes signed for Everton in the spring.

Inconsistent performances in the league, particularly away from home, meant Arsenal never posed a serious threat to Manchester United, the reigning champions. Midfielder Patrick Vieira was suspended from playing for much of late autumn after a confrontation with West Ham United player Neil Ruddock. In October, Arsenal notably staged a comeback against Chelsea, with Nwankwo Kanu scoring a hat-trick in the final 15 minutes of the game. A run of eight straight wins between March and May propelled Arsenal from fifth to second and the team finished on 73 points.

Background

Arsenal ended the previous season as runners-up to Manchester United in the Premier League. The club made an indifferent start to the campaign as reigning league champions and failed to progress past the group stages of the UEFA Champions League. After defeat to Aston Villa in December 1998, Arsenal embarked on a 19 match unbeaten run (21 in all competitions) to climb up the league table. The run in all competitions ended against Manchester United in a FA Cup semi-final replay. In April Arsenal moved to the top of the Premier League after beating Middlesbrough 6–1, albeit having played a match more than Manchester United. A 3–1 away win against Tottenham Hotspur put Arsenal three points clear as United lost to Liverpool on the same night. Going into the final two matches of the season, both clubs were on the same points, but Arsenal's defeat to Leeds United all but ended their chances of retaining the title.

At the start of the 1999–2000 season, Arsenal ended its long-standing kit sponsorship with JVC. The club signed a three-year deal with SEGA as replacement, worth £10 million. The SEGA Dreamcast name was carried on the home kit, while SEGA was embroidered on the new yellow away kit.

Transfers
Frenchman Rémi Garde retired from career football at the end of the 1998–99 season. Kaba Diawara left Arsenal six months after joining to sign for Marseille. Defender Steve Bould moved to Sunderland for an estimated fee of £500,000, which ended his 11-year association with Arsenal. The player felt it was the "right decision" as he wanted first-team football.

In May 1999, Nicolas Anelka stated his desire to leave Arsenal and cited the English media as a reason for wanting to leave the club as they caused him "enormous problems on a personal level". Lazio was interested in signing the player, but the Italian club refused to pay Arsenal's asking price of £23 million. After Real Madrid reopened negotiations with Arsenal and Anelka, a deal was finally reached on 1 August 1999 and the player signed for the club, the next day. Arsenal sought to strengthen the squad's attacking options first by signing Davor Šuker from Real Madrid; the player was prepared to take a pay cut to join the club. The club then signed Juventus forward Thierry Henry for a club record fee of £11 million. Wenger, who served as the player's mentor at Monaco, believed his best position was as a goalscorer: "He was the top scorer in the Under-17s for France when I first had him and I think that, as well as having the qualities of youth, pace and power, he is a good finisher. That is something he has not worked on enough in the last two years because he has played more wide, but I think he can become a central striker again. That is what we will try to develop together."

Other additions to the squad included Sylvinho and Oleh Luzhnyi. Striker Luís Boa Morte moved to Southampton in August 1999, while midfielder Stephen Hughes completed his transfer to Everton in March 2000.

In

Out

Loan out

Pre-season and friendlies
In preparation for the forthcoming season, Arsenal played a series of friendlies. In England, they travelled away to play Boreham Wood, and Notts County, before travelling to France to play Saint-Étienne and AS Monaco.

Lee Dixon Testimonial 
The club also staged a testimonial for defender Lee Dixon once the season commenced against Real Madrid.

FA Charity Shield

The 1999 edition of the FA Charity Shield was contested between Manchester United and Arsenal. The game took place at Wembley Stadium on 1 August. Manchester United went ahead seven minutes before the end of the first half, but late goals from Kanu and Ray Parlour gave Arsenal victory in the match. Wenger believed the result showed that his team were "ready for the season" and thought it was "...psychologically important to beat United, especially after the great run they have had".

Premier League

August–October

Arsenal began the league season with a home fixture against Leicester City. Henry started the match on the substitutes' bench along with Overmars and Upson, while Šuker was absent as he was unfit. After a quiet first half, Leicester scored the opening goal when Neil Lennon's intervention prompted striker Tony Cottee to "gleefully pounce from inside the six-yard box". Dennis Bergkamp equalised for Arsenal in the 65th minute and with time running out, the home team scored the winner in unexpected circumstances. Defender Frank Sinclair headed the ball into the back of his team's goal net, after Leicester failed to deal with a corner. Three days later, Emmanuel Petit and Bergkamp scored in Arsenal's win against Derby County; the team's performance was described by Wenger as "more resilient than brilliant". Arsenal drew 0–0 with newly promoted Sunderland on 14 August 1999, in a match where Petit and Bergkamp both suffered injuries. A week after the team faced Manchester United at Highbury. It was billed as "the world's first live interactive match", allowing viewers of Sky Digital access to statistics and alternative camera angles. United midfielder Roy Keane scored twice to overturn Arsenal's 41st-minute lead and inflict the home team's first defeat since December 1997. Arsenal recovered three days later to defeat Bradford City by two goals to nil, but lost to Liverpool at Anfield in their final game of August.

September saw Arsenal win all of their league matches. At home to Aston Villa, Šuker scored his first goals for the club and earned the praise of his manager Wenger: "He is just obsessed by goals. You feel when he is inside the box he hits the target." Away to Southampton, it was the other signing Henry who scored his first goal for Arsenal. The player, on as a substitute, received the ball from Tony Adams and with his back to goal "some 20 yards out", turned and curled it past goalkeeper Paul Jones. Henry later admitted his failure to score for Arsenal before then was getting him down: "My goal today was very important for me. I have missed at least 14 or 15 chances for Arsenal and my confidence was low." Kanu scored the only goal of the match against Watford, which moved Arsenal in third position, two points behind leaders Manchester United.

Arsenal faced West Ham United in the first weekend of October. Dixon, Nigel Winterburn and Overmars were rested for the match, replaced by Oleh Luzhnyi, Slyvinho and Davor Šuker. In spite of general dominance from Arsenal, West Ham striker Paolo di Canio scored in each half to win his team the match. Patrick Vieira was dismissed during play for a foul on Di Canio. A confrontation soon after occurred between the player and Neil Ruddock. Vieira was subsequently charged, banned for six matches and fined a record £45,000 by The Football Association. Šuker scored twice against Everton at Highbury on 16 October 1999. Arsenal then travelled to Stamford Bridge to face Chelsea. Goals from Tore André Flo and Dan Petrescu seemed to have given the home side victory, before Kanu scored a hat-trick in the space of 15 minutes. His first involved extending his legs and stabbing the ball past goalkeeper Ed de Goey, once it fell kindly in his direction. The equaliser came in the 83rd minute: Kanu received the ball from Overmars, which took him away from goal but hit the ball to the left of De Goey's dive. In injury time Kanu, in the downpour, chased down the ball and dribbled past the stranded Chelsea goalkeeper on the byline, before curling the ball over Frank Leboeuf and into the far corner of the goal net. Kanu's teammate Šuker described the third goal as "beautiful", while Bergkamp added: "The skills he has got, the moves he makes, are something you like to watch and learn from. I watch him in training and it is a joy." The month ended with a goalless draw at home to Newcastle United, which left Arsenal fourth, three points behind league leaders Leeds United.

November–February
Arsenal's first fixture of November was the North London derby against Tottenham Hotspur. After 20 minutes, Tottenham were 2–0 up after goals from Steffen Iversen and Tim Sherwood. Vieira scored for Arsenal from a header, but there were no further goals in the game. In the second half Ljungberg was sent off, as was Keown in stoppage time, to reduce Arsenal to nine men. The team responded with a 5–1 win against Middlesbrough, in which Overmars scored three goals. Arsenal then came from behind to beat Derby County on 28 November 1999; they ended the month in third, three points behind Leeds United in first.

Gilles Grimandi, Dixon and Overmars scored a goal apiece in Arsenal's victory at Leicester City in early December. Matthew Upson was forced to come off the pitch before the half-hour mark, after suffering a knee injury. Arsenal only managed a draw against Wimbledon on 18 December 1999; Henry's second half goal cancelled out Wimbledon's opener – a cross by Marcus Gayle met Carl Cort, whose shot hit goalkeeper Alex Manninger's left leg and went in. The poor form over Christmas continued: Arsenal lost 3–2 to Coventry City on Boxing Day. Rob Hughes of The Times noted his concerns about Arsenal's defence, which: "...conceded 17 goals last season but now, at the halfway stage, [...] have already let in 20", but did go on to add "there was nothing lacking in the tenacity of Arsenal." Vieira made his return for the match against league leaders Leeds United, who were eight points in front of Arsenal. Wenger reshuffled the defence, dropping Dixon and Winterburn for Luzhnyi and Sylvinho, while Grimandi replaced Keown who was injured. Ljungberg and Henry scored for Arsenal in their 2–0 win to put the team third at the end of 1999. Adams suggested after the Leeds match that his opponents' inexperience and thin squad would jeopardise their chances of winning the league: "They are still involved in the UEFA Cup and the FA Cup as well. So come February time they will start to feel that pressure – and you don't know what it is like until you have been through it."

On 3 January 2000, Arsenal played Sheffield Wednesday at Hillsborough and were held to a 1–1 draw. Two concerns for Arsenal were Overmars' ankle injury sustained during the match and the absence of Kanu, who left to represent his country in the African Nations Cup. Arsenal recorded a 4–1 win against Sunderland to move level on points with Manchester United in second, though the champions had three games in hand. The first was against Arsenal at Old Trafford on 24 January 2000. Wenger selected five midfielders in his starting team, as injuries limited his forward options. Arsenal began the match the better of the two teams and led 1–0 after 11 minutes, after good play from Ljungberg. United as the game went on looked "fresher", with substitute Teddy Sheringham equalising in the second half.

February saw Arsenal's title challenge take a turn for the worse, with consecutive defeats. The first came at Valley Parade, away to Bradford City. Striker Dean Saunders scored the match winner in the 57th minute, which marked Arsenal's fifth defeat in a dozen away league games. The team then lost to Liverpool at home a week later, who moved into third place. Wenger said it "had been a very bad week" for Arsenal, and noted "qualification for third place [was] not over … it's still possible if we get our players back in the right shape". The month ended with a 3–1 win against Southampton, in which Bergkamp and Kanu returned to the starting line-up.

March–May

Dixon's late goal earned Arsenal a point against Aston Villa on 5 March 2000. The team, without Adams, Keown and Overmars, lost to Middlesbrough a week later. Wenger conceded afterwards his team were paying for their participation in the UEFA Cup, as "…the recovery time is too short. We only had two and a half days, which is not enough, especially when you are travelling". Arsenal beat their rivals Tottenham a week later. Henry, Grimandi and Kanu each scored in Arsenal's 3–0 victory against Coventry City. After 30 games, Arsenal were in fourth position, two points behind Liverpool in third and 13 away from leaders Manchester United.

In spite of playing the second half against Wimbledon with ten men after the dismissal of Luzhnyi, Arsenal defeated their London rivals by three goals to one. Before the game away to Leeds United on 16 April 2000, both clubs observed a minute's silence to honour the two Leeds fans who were murdered in Istanbul. Wenger and his players then presented bouquets of flowers to their counterparts. Arsenal went ahead in the 21st minute – Henry beat defender Jonathan Woodgate for pace and scored his 20th goal of the season. Further goals by Keown, Kanu and Overmars resulted in a 4–0 win and lifted Arsenal above Leeds into third, with a better goal difference. Arsenal beat Watford and continued their strong finish to the season with a 1–0 win at Everton to move into second place. Wenger believed Manchester United, who retained their status as champions in April, had benefited from the league being "organised" in their favour: "They had a winter break. They didn't play in the FA Cup. It was all wrong from the start. The break was good for them because at the same time we dropped points and so did the other teams. So when they came back they had the psychological advantage."

Petit scored a 90th-minute winner for Arsenal against West Ham United and a further win against Chelsea ensured Arsenal finished second, as Leeds and Liverpool failed to win their respective matches. Arsenal played out a 3–3 draw against Sheffield Wednesday, which relegated their opponents in the process. Arsenal ended their league campaign against Newcastle United at St James' Park. Wenger rested several first-team players to prioritise the 2000 UEFA Cup Final the following week. Arsenal lost 4–2, with Newcastle striker Alan Shearer notably scoring the 300th goal of his career.

Match results

 1 Kick-off was scheduled at 20:00, but Mark Bosnich was given time to change his shirt because the colour of it had the same colours as Arsenal's away shirt.

Classification

Results summary

Results by round

FA Cup

Arsenal entered the competition in the third round, by virtue of their Premier League status. Their opening match was a 3–1 win against Second Division Blackpool, where Grimandi, Adams and Overmars got themselves on the scoresheet. In the fourth round, Arsenal faced Leicester City at Highbury. The match ended goalless, meaning a replay was staged at Filbert Street. With neither side able to score in the 90 minutes and extra time, the game was settled on penalties. Leicester goalkeeper Pegguy Arphexad blocked Dixon and Grimandi's spot-kicks to help his side win. Wenger said he was "upset" with the loss, adding "the most important thing is the championship and we have to concentrate on it."

Football League Cup

Together with the other clubs playing in European competitions, Arsenal entered the Football League Cup in the third round. The team were drawn to face First Division Preston North End, on the week of 11 October 1999.  Kanu and Stefan Malz scored a goal apiece to ensure Arsenal progressed into the fourth round, where they played Middlesbrough away. The team exited the competition on penalties, after a score draw.

UEFA Champions League

Group stage

Finishing second in Premier League the previous season ensured Arsenal's qualification into the UEFA Champions League. For the second season running, Arsenal played their home matches at Wembley Stadium. The club were drawn in Group B, along with Italian club Fiorentina, Barcelona of Spain and Sweden's AIK. In the opening match against Fiorentina, Arsenal dominated possession and created the better chances of the game, but earned no more than a point after Kanu's late penalty miss. The team defeated AIK at Wembley a week after and drew with Barcelona at the Camp Nou. In the reverse fixture, Barcelona defeated Arsenal 4–2 and Wenger rued afterwards: "The defence did not have a good day. They were exposed and didn't get any protection." Arsenal progressed no further in competition after the team were beaten by Fiorentina; Gabriel Batistuta scored the only goal of the match. Overmars scored twice in Arsenal's final group game away to AIK.

UEFA Cup

As Arsenal finished third in their Champions League group, they entered the UEFA Cup. Wenger said he intended to take the competition seriously given the team's poor UEFA coefficient. Arsenal played their home games at Highbury instead of Wembley.

Knockout stages
Third round
Arsenal faced French club Nantes and won the first leg 3–0; Winterburn scored the pick of the three – "a rare but brilliantly struck goal". The team drew the second leg 3–3, though it was enough to see them progress on aggregate score.

Fourth round
At home to Deportivo La Coruña, Arsenal opened the scoring in the fifth minute through Dixon and further goals from Henry, Kanu and Bergkamp ensured it was the club's first victory over Spanish opposition in Europe. Although the team were defeated in the second leg, Arsenal won 6–3 on aggregate.

Quarter-finals
Against Werder Bremen, Arsenal won the first leg 2–0 with goals from Henry and Ljungberg. Parlour scored a hat-trick in the return leg – the first of his career.

Semi-finals
Arsenal faced French club Lens in the final four and won the first leg by a solitary goal, scored by Bergkamp in the second minute. Victory in the second leg ensured passage to the final. Wenger commented afterwards: "People say we should not have come into this competition, but we have not got the final the easy way – we have played 14 games to get this far."

Final

In the lead up to the final against Galatasaray in Copenhagen, scuffles took place between British and Turkish supporters at City Hall Square after an Arsenal fan was stabbed. The incident, dubbed the "Battle of Copenhagen" by the media led to 19 civilians injured and 60 arrests. The match itself was a lacklustre affair; neither side scored after 90 minutes and in extra time Gheorghe Hagi was sent off. It was decided on penalties and Arsenal lost after Šuker and Patrick Vieira missed their spot-kicks. Wenger was disappointed with the manner of the defeat and criticised Spanish referee Antonio López Nieto for not tossing a coin to decide where the shoot-out would take place like UEFA promised him.

Player statistics
Arsenal used a total of 32 players during the 1999–2000 season and there were 15 different goalscorers. There were also six squad members who did not make a first-team appearance in the campaign. Kanu featured in 50 matches whereas Vieira started the most games for Arsenal – 47 in total.

The team scored a total of 106 goals in all competitions. The highest goalscorer was Henry, with 26 goals, followed by Kanu who scored 17 goals. Six Arsenal players were sent off during the season: Vieira, Keown, Henry, Grimandi (twice) and Luzhnyi.

Key

No. = Squad number

Pos = Playing position

Nat. = Nationality

Apps = Appearances

GK = Goalkeeper

DF = Defender

MF = Midfielder

FW = Forward

 = Yellow cards

 = Red cards

Numbers in parentheses denote appearances as substitute. Players with number struck through and marked  left the club during the playing season.

Source:

See also
 1999–2000 in English football
 List of Arsenal F.C. seasons

References

Arsenal
Arsenal F.C. seasons